Forever Your Girl is the debut studio album by American singer Paula Abdul. It was released on June 21, 1988, through Virgin Records. The album was Abdul's breakthrough into the music industry after being a choreographer for high-profile artists including George Michael, ZZ Top, Duran Duran and most notably Janet Jackson. At the time of the album's release it was the most successful debut album of all time and was the first time an artist scored four US Billboard Hot 100 number-one singles from a debut album. It is currently certified 7× platinum by the RIAA.

Background 
In 1987, Abdul, once a choreographer for Los Angeles Lakers and high-profile artists including George Michael, ZZ Top, Duran Duran and most notably Janet Jackson, used her savings to make a singing demo. Soon thereafter, she was signed to Virgin Records by Jeff Ayeroff, who had worked in marketing at A&M Records with Janet Jackson. Although she was a skilled dancer and choreographer, Abdul was a relatively untrained singer, and worked with various coaches and record producers to develop her vocal ability, with her vocal range defined as mezzo-soprano. Ayeroff recalled signing Abdul to a recording contract years later, stating: "She said, 'I can sing, you know. I want to do an album.' Paula's in our industry. Here's someone with a personality and she's gorgeous, and she can dance. If she can sing, she could be a star. So she went into the studio and cut a demo record and she could sing." The album was made on a budget of $72,000.

Release and reception
On October 7, 1989, 64 weeks after its July 23, 1988 debut on the chart, Forever Your Girl hit number one on the Billboard 200 album sales chart, the longest an album has been on the market before hitting number one. The album was eventually certified seven times Platinum in the US by the RIAA and has sold over 18 million copies worldwide. It also includes four number one Billboard Hot 100 singles: "Straight Up", "Forever Your Girl", "Cold Hearted", and "Opposites Attract", which ties Forever Your Girl for second most number-one songs from a single album, and ties it for the most number ones in a debut album. She was the first female artist to have four number one singles from a debut album. "The Way That You Love Me" reached #3, and "Knocked Out" reached #41.

The album also reached #4 on the R&B album chart, while "Straight Up", "Opposites Attract", "Knocked Out", and "(It's Just) The Way That You Love Me" all reached the top 10 of the R&B tracks chart.

After a slow start, the album's third single "Straight Up" helped the album breakout in spring/summer 1989 after its initial summer 1988 release. Forever Your Girl hit number one for the first time on October 7, 1989. After the release of the single "Opposites Attract", the album shot to number one again on February 3, 1990 and stayed there for nine consecutive weeks.

By 1998, Billboard Magazine reported that Forever Your Girl was the most successful album released by the Virgin Records label, with all five of its top 20 hits also appearing on the same chart ranking Virgin's singles.

Accolades

Track listing

Personnel
Adapted from AllMusic.

 Paula Abdul – lead vocals  
 Marvin Gunn and Bruce DeShazer AKA Tony Christin - backing vocals 
 Peter Arata – mixing assistant
 Babyface – keyboards, producer, backing vocals
 Glen Ballard – drums, producer, programming
 Russ Bracher – engineer
 Pattie Brooks – backing vocals
 Wally Buck – engineer
 Francis Buckley – engineer, mixing
 Annette Cisneros – assistant engineer
 Dave Cochran – guitar, backing vocals
 Keith "KC" Cohen – mixing, producer
 Delisa Davis – backing vocals
 Tami Day – backing vocals
 Jimmy Demers – backing vocals
 Eddie M. – saxophone on "I Need You"
 Al Fleming – assistant engineer
 Basil Fung – guitar
 Jon Gass – engineer, mixing
 Bobby Gonzales – guitar
 Danny Grigsby – assistant engineer
 Evelyn Halus – backing vocals
 Dann Huff – guitar
 Tim Jaquette – engineer, mixing
 Jesse Johnson – drums, keyboards, producer
 Cliff Jones – assistant engineer, engineer
 Kayo – synthesizer, synthesizer bass
 Oliver Leiber – arranger, drum programming, guitar, keyboards, producer, programming
 Jeff Lorber – drum programming, engineer, guest artist, keyboards, producer
 Yvette Marine – backing vocals
 Pat McDougal – assistant engineer
 Lucia Newell – backing vocals
 Ricky P. – keyboards
 Pebbles – guest artist, backing vocals
 L.A. Reid – drums, guest artist, percussion programming, producer
 Angel Rogers – backing vocals
 Josh Schneider – assistant engineer
 Daryl Simmons – backing vocals
 Bob Somma – guitar
 St. Paul – arranger, bass, keyboards, Organ, vocoder
 Kendall Stubbs – engineer
 Randy Weber – programming, synthesizer
 Steve Weise – engineer
 Troy Williams - saxophone on "Forever Your Girl"
 Wild Pair – vocals, backing vocals

Charts

Certifications

See also
List of best-selling albums by women

References

External links
Paula Abdul Billboard peaks

1988 debut albums
Paula Abdul albums
Virgin Records albums
Albums produced by L.A. Reid
Albums produced by Babyface (musician)
New jack swing albums